Richard Moses Longfellow (June 24, 1867 – May 17, 1951)  was a United States Army Private that received the Medal of Honor for actions on May 16, 1899. Private Longfellow was part of Young's Scouts.

He is buried at Normal Hill Cemetery in Lewiston, Idaho.

Medal of Honor citation
Rank and Organization: Private, Company A, 1st North Dakota Volunteer Infantry. Place and Date: Near San Isidro, Philippine Islands, May 16, 1899. Entered Service At: Mandan, N. Dak. Birth: Logan County, Ill, Date of Issue: Unknown.

Citation:

With 21 other scouts charged across a burning bridge, under heavy fire, and completely routed 600 of the enemy who were entrenched in a strongly fortified position.

See also

List of Medal of Honor recipients
List of Philippine–American War Medal of Honor recipients

Notes

References

United States Army soldiers
United States Army Medal of Honor recipients
1867 births
1951 deaths
American military personnel of the Philippine–American War
Philippine–American War recipients of the Medal of Honor